Antúnez is a Spanish patronymic surname derived from the Antonius root name, widely spread in all Latin America countries as a consequence of Spanish colonization. Its Portuguese variant is Antunes.  Notable people with this name include the following:

Nickname
Antúnez, nickname of Jorge Luis García Pérez, (born 1964), Cuban activist

Surname
Alfonso Blanco Antunez (born 1987), Mexican footballer 
 (1847-1897), Chilean politician 
Daniel Antúnez (born 1986), American footballer
Francisco Antúnez (1922-1994), Spanish footballer
Jesús Antúnez (born 1973), Spanish musician
José Miguel Antúnez (born 1967), Spanish basketball player
Julio César Antúnez (born 1956), Uruguayan footballer and manager 
Marcel·lí Antúnez Roca (born 1959), Spanish digital artist
Nemesio Antúnez (1918-1993), Chilean painter and engraver
Ricardo Peral Antunez (born 1974), Spanish basketball player
Santiago Antúnez de Mayolo (born 1887), Peruvian engineer, physicist and mathematician

See also

Notes

Patronymic surnames
Spanish-language surnames